Shadia Abu Ghazaleh (1949-1968) was a Palestinian political activist, also described as a terrorist. She died in an explosion in her own home while preparing a bomb to be deployed in Tel Aviv. She is described as "among the first Palestinian women to participate in military resistance after the 1967 occupation" or "one of the first female Palestinian terrorists".

She was born on 8 January 1949 in Nablus and educated at the Fatimid School for Girls. She studied in Egypt for one year at Ain Shams University in Cairo, but then decided to continue her studies, in psychology and social science, at An-Najah National University in Nablus. She was involved in the Arab Nationalist Movement in 1964, and was one of the early members of the Popular Front for the Liberation of Palestine when it was founded in 1967. Within the movement she led women's organisations and was involved in the political and military education of young people: "she viewed education, knowledge, and science as weapons in the struggle for liberation".

She died on 28 November 1968, aged 19, in an explosion in her own home while preparing a bomb, said to have been intended for an attack on Tel Aviv.

Two schools have been named in her memory: the Shadia Abu Ghazaleh School for Girls in Gaza and the Shadia Abu Ghazaleh High School for Boys in Jabalia.

References

1949 births
1968 deaths
20th-century Palestinian women
Palestinian activists